Vuyisile Wana (born 24 May 1987 in Odendaalsrus, Free State) is a South African football (soccer) player who plays as a striker for Magesi.

References

1987 births
Living people
South African soccer players
South African Premier Division players
National First Division players
Association football forwards
Roses United F.C. players
Santos F.C. (South Africa) players
Moroka Swallows F.C. players
Bloemfontein Celtic F.C. players
Magesi F.C. players
Soccer players from the Free State (province)